Balbir Singh Pama was a Lieutenant General in the Indian Army and Chief of Staff of Northern Command. He is also the author of the book Paradigm Shift of Training in the Army: Including Joint Training.

References

Indian generals
Indian military writers
Living people
Year of birth missing (living people)